Jorge Daniel Valdez Godoy, (born 14 July 1974) is a football defender from Paraguay.

Career
Valdez started his career in Olimpia Asunción as a right-side defender, and won several national championships with the team. He then went on to play for many Paraguayan teams and for the Argentine side Central Norte. His nickname is "Repollo" (Cabbage).

Titles

References

External links
 
 

1974 births
Living people
Paraguayan footballers
Club Olimpia footballers
Club Sol de América footballers
Sportivo Luqueño players
Association football defenders
Paraguay international footballers